Jacques Rosny (25 March 1939 – 18 April 2020) was a French actor.

Biography
Rosny married actress Annick Blancheteau in 1971, with whom he had two kids.

In 1973, with Jean-Claude Houdinière and Loïc Vollard, Rosny purchased the Théâtre de l'Athénée. He left the theatre the following year.

Jacques Rosny died on 18 April 2020 at the age of 81 in Nogent-sur-Marne due to COVID-19.

Filmography

Cinema
Un nuage entre les dents (1974) - Un rédacteur
Le Chaud Lapin (1974) - Le metteur en scène de théâtre
Catherine & Co. (1975) - Jean-Pierre
The Tenant (1976) - Jean-Claude
Le Dernier Baisier (1977) - L'agent de Police
Clara et les Chics Types (1981) - Michel
Périgord noir (1989) - Charles
Loulou Graffiti (1992) - Le proviseur
L.627 (1992) - Tulipe 4
Le Troc (1993) - Avocat de la défense
Profil bas (1993) - Malard
Les Braqueuses (1994)

Television
Voulez-vous jouer avec moâ? (1972) - Rascasse
M. Klebs et Rosalie (1977, TV Movie)
Richelieu (1977) - Louis XIII
Les Folies Offenbach (1977) - René Luguet
Le Loup blanc (1977, TV Movie) - Jean Blanc / Le 'loup blanc'
Les Grandes Conjurations (1978) - Henri III
Mazarin (1978) - Louis XIII
Les Youx bleus (1979) - Charles Sorgues
L'Abuseur de Séville (1980, TV Movie) - Batricio
La Naissance du jour (1980) - Segonzac
Les Folies du samedi soir (1980, TV Movie) - Gaston
Bel ami (1983) - La Roche Mathieu
Un homme va être assassiné (1984, TV Movie) - Charles Pélissier
Le Diable dans le bénitier (1985, TV Movie) - L'abbé Michel
Le Cri de la chouette (1986, TV Movie) - Jean Rezeau
Le Dernier Tour (1994, TV Movie) - Benoli
Comment épouser un héritage? (1995, TV Movie) - Le maire
Coeur de cible (1996, TV Movie) - Le directeur Rhinocéros
L'Amerloque (1996, TV Movie) - Monsieur de Mandrieu
Mauvaises Affaires (1997, TV Movie) - Guérin, le procureur (final film role)

Awards
Prix du Brigadier (1985)

References

1939 births
2020 deaths
Deaths from the COVID-19 pandemic in France
People from Tarbes
French male film actors
French male television actors